Carmenta foraseminis is a moth of the family Sesiidae. It was described by Thomas Drake Eichlin in 1995, and is known from Panama, Colombia, Venezuela, and Brazil. The larva of the species have been found on plants of the species Gustavia angustifolia, Gustavia superba, as well as plants in the genus Eschweilera, and on the pods of Theobroma cacao.

References

Sesiidae
Moths described in 1995